Drawcansir is a fictional character in George Villiers, 2nd Duke of Buckingham's farce, The Rehearsal. He kills every one of the combatants, "sparing neither friend nor foe."

References

Male characters in literature
Literary characters introduced in 1671